The Schermerhorn Building at 376–380 Lafayette Street on the corner of Great Jones Street in the NoHo neighborhood of Manhattan, New York City, was built in 1888–1889 by William C. Schermerhorn on the site of the Schermerhorn mansion, and rented by him to a boys' clothing manufacturer.  The Romanesque Revival loft building was designed by Henry Hardenbergh, architect of the Plaza Hotel and The Dakota. The building is constructed of brownstone, sandstone, terra-cotta and wood, and has dwarf columns made of marble.

The building has been a New York City Landmark since 1966, and was added to the National Register of Historic Places on December 28, 1979.

See also
National Register of Historic Places listings in Manhattan below 14th Street
List of New York City Designated Landmarks in Manhattan below 14th Street

References
Notes

External links

Henry Janeway Hardenbergh buildings
Gothic Revival architecture in New York City
Industrial buildings completed in 1889
Buildings and structures on the National Register of Historic Places in Manhattan
New York City Designated Landmarks in Manhattan
Schermerhorn family
Industrial buildings and structures in Manhattan
Industrial buildings and structures on the National Register of Historic Places in New York City